James Ernest Sciutto (born March 10, 1970) is an American news anchor and former government official who has been the chief national security correspondent for CNN since September 2013. In this role he provides analysis on a variety of topics concerning United States national security, including foreign policy, the military, terrorism, and the intelligence community. From 2011 to 2013, he served as chief of staff to U.S. Ambassador Gary Locke at the U.S. Embassy in Beijing. Prior to his appointment as chief of staff, he was senior foreign correspondent for ABC News, based in London. He is the author of Against Us: The New Face of America's Enemies in the Muslim World among other books.

Biography
Sciutto attended St. Ignatius Loyola School before Regis High School in Manhattan. He is of Italian and Irish descent. Sciutto is a 1992 graduate of Yale College (Pierson) where he majored in Chinese history and graduated cum laude. Sciutto began his career in television as the moderator and the producer of the PBS program The Student Press, a weekly public affairs talk show aimed at college students. Sciutto was the Hong Kong correspondent for Asia Business News, and covered the return of Hong Kong to China in 1997. Sciutto also covered stories in China, Mongolia, Laos, Vietnam, Singapore, and South Korea. He joined ABC News in 1998, working in Chicago before moving to Washington, D.C. to cover the Pentagon.

Sciutto was an appointee of the Obama administration, serving as chief of staff and senior advisor to the U.S. Ambassador to China, Gary Locke.

In 2006, he married ABC News Correspondent Gloria Riviera in a Roman Catholic ceremony in Manhattan.

Works

Honors
 Edward R. Murrow Award for his reporting from Iran during the 2009 election protests.
 George Polk Award for Television Reporting in 2007 for his undercover reporting inside Myanmar.
 Emmy awards in 2004 and 2005 for best story in a regularly scheduled newscast for his reporting in Iraq. Emmy nominations in 2008 for his reporting inside Myanmar and in 2005 for his reporting in Beslan, Russia during the school siege.
 Fulbright Fellow in Hong Kong from 1993 to 1994.
 Associate Fellow of Pierson College at Yale.
 Selected as a life member of the Council on Foreign Relations in 2008.

See also
 New Yorkers in journalism
 Madman Theory

References

External links

1970 births
Yale University alumni
American male journalists
Journalists from New York City
Living people
George Polk Award recipients
ABC News personalities
CNN people
Regis High School (New York City) alumni
American people of Italian descent
American people of Irish descent